V. V. Rankine, also known as Elvine Richard Rankine, Elvine Magruder, and Vivian Scott Rankine (1920–2004), was an American artist and art teacher. She was known for her minimalist sculptures.

Biography 
Rankine was born on July 27, 1920, and raised in Boston. This was followed by study at Black Mountain College, where she met and study with Elaine de Kooning, Willem de Kooning, and Josef Albers. She showed her work at Jefferson Place Gallery.

Her work is included in the collection of the Smithsonian American Art Museum, the American University Museum and the Phillips Collection. Her personal papers are included in the Archives of American Art.

References

External links 
 V. V. Rankine papers, 1945-1980, Archives of American Art, Smithsonian Institution

1920 births
2004 deaths
Artists from Boston
20th-century American women artists
20th-century American artists
21st-century American women
Black Mountain College alumni